Clinton David Boon (born 28 June 1959) is an English musician, DJ and radio presenter. Boon originally rose to fame as the keyboard player (and sometimes vocalist) of Inspiral Carpets.

Music career
Born in Oldham, Lancashire, Boon joined the Inspiral Carpets in 1986 after previously playing in a band called The Mill. After the Inspiral Carpets split in 1995, Boon went on to form The Clint Boon Experience releasing two albums under this name – The Compact Guide to Pop Music and Space Travel (1999), and Life in Transition (2000). 

In this year the band released the single "Do What You Do (Earworm Song)", which featured Fran Healy, the lead singer of the band Travis. Boon has his own record label, 'Booney Tunes', signing artists such as Elaine Palmer, and has also been a regular DJ at a number of nightclubs around England, and in Wrexham, North Wales. He rejoined the Inspiral Carpets for two sell-out tours in 2002 and 2003 and has remained with them.

Media career
Boon made a cameo appearance in the 2002 film 24 Hour Party People as a train conductor and also worked with Cosgrove Hall providing music for the Engie Benjy cartoon series.

In 1995, Boon began working for Liverpool's Crash FM after being recruited by DJ Janice Long and has also stood in for DJ Terry Christian on Century FM in Manchester.

In 2005, Boon became head of music of the Oldham-based radio station The Revolution, where he presented the 10am to 2pm weekday show. In 2006, he left the station for its then rival Xfm Manchester, where he began presenting the drivetime show. The following year Boon received two Sony Award nominations for his XFM show in the Music Broadcaster and Specialist Music Programme categories. Boon has a cult following, with regular listeners to his show being unofficially enrolled in the Boon Army. In 2015, Xfm Manchester transitioned into Radio X and began broadcasting nationally; Boon then hosted a Sunday evening show between 7pm and 11pm. It was shortened to 8pm to 11pm from 23 April 2016. His last show was on 19 March 2017.

He has been a resident DJ on Saturday nights at the club South in Manchester for fifteen years, while also hosting other nights around the UK.

In 2016, Boon began presenting an '80s music show on BBC Radio Manchester on Saturdays between 6pm and 8pm. He left the station in 2017,  and started a new drivetime radio show #ThatsGoodInnit at XS Manchester.

References in popular culture
In 2008 Boon had his portrait painted by Manchester-based artist Adam Hayley. The portrait represents many aspects of Boon's life and incorporates references to his Manchester roots. The portrait was unveiled at Manchester's Mooch Art Gallery on Oldham Street, in the Northern Quarter. Subsequently, Adam Hayley donated the painting to the Boon family.

Charity work
In 2013, Boon became patron of SiMBA, a charity supporting parents who have lost a very young baby, following the death of his daughter, Luna Bliss, who was born prematurely in April 2012 at St Mary's Hospital in Manchester and died 34 days later. 

Boon's middle son Hector wanted to raise money for the hospital and was sponsored to have his long hair cut with the fundraising appeal becoming known as Hector's Fund. The Boon family continue to raise money for St. Mary's and to date Hector's Fund has raised £40,000 and paid for custom-made mother and baby feeding chairs for the hospital.

In January 2015, Boon launched a campaign to recruit runners to take part in the 10K Great Manchester Run to raise money for the Royal Manchester Children's Hospital Charity and the Saint Mary's Hospital Charity's Neonatal Intensive Care Unit. Members of the public were invited to sign up and run as part of the Boon Army to raise sponsorship money for the charities.

Discography
The Clint Boon Experience
The Compact Guide to Pop Music and Space Travel (1999)
Life in Transition (2000)

Inspiral Carpets
Life (1990)
The Beast Inside (1991)
Revenge of the Goldfish (1992)
Devil Hopping (1994)
Inspiral Carpets (2014)

References

External links
Clint Boon official site
Clint Boon on Radio X

1959 births
Club DJs
English DJs
English radio presenters
English rock keyboardists
Inspiral Carpets members
Living people
Musicians from the Metropolitan Borough of Oldham
People educated at St Bede's College, Manchester
People from Oldham
Rock DJs